Pir Sabz or Pir-e Sabz may refer to:
 Pir-e Sabz, Fars
 Pir Sabz, Rostam, Fars Province
 Pir Sabz, Kohgiluyeh and Boyer-Ahmad
 Pir-e Sabz, Yazd